The term fellow traveller (also fellow traveler) identifies a person who is intellectually sympathetic to the ideology of a political organization, and who co-operates in the organization's politics, without being a formal member of that organization. In the early history of the Soviet Union, the Bolshevik revolutionary and Soviet statesman Anatoly Lunacharsky coined the term poputchik ('one who travels the same path') and later it was popularized by Leon Trotsky to identify the vacillating intellectual supporters of the Bolshevik government. It was the political characterisation of the Russian intelligentsiya (writers, academics, and artists) who were philosophically sympathetic to the political, social, and economic goals of the Russian Revolution of 1917, but who did not join the Communist Party of the Soviet Union. The usage of the term poputchik disappeared from political discourse in the Soviet Union during the Stalinist régime, but the Western world adopted the English term fellow traveller to identify people who sympathised with the Soviets and with Communism.

In U.S. politics, during the 1940s and the 1950s, the term fellow traveler was a pejorative term for a person who was philosophically sympathetic to Communism, yet was not a formal, "card-carrying member" of the Communist Party USA. In political discourse, the term fellow traveler was applied to intellectuals, academics, and politicians who lent their names and prestige to Communist front organizations.

In European politics, the equivalent terms for fellow traveller are: Compagnon de route and  sympathisant in France; Weggenosse, Sympathisant (neutral) or Mitläufer (negative connotation) in Germany; and compagno di strada in Italy.

European usages

USSR

In 1917, after the Russian Revolution, the Bolsheviks applied the term Poputchik ("one who travels the same path") to Russian writers who accepted the revolution, but who were not active revolutionaries. In the book Literature and Revolution (1923), Leon Trotsky popularized the usage of Poputchik as a political descriptor attributed to the pre-Revolutionary Russian Social Democratic Labour Party (the Social Democrats) to identify a vacillating political sympathizer. In Chapter 2, "The Literary 'Fellow-Travellers' of the Revolution", Trotsky said:  Between bourgeois Art, which is wasting away either in repetitions or in silences, and the new art which is as yet unborn, there is being created a transitional art, which is more or less organically connected with the Revolution, but which is not, at the same time, the Art of the Revolution. Boris Pilnyak, Vsevolod Ivanov, Nicolai Tikhonov, the Serapion Fraternity, Yesenin and his group of Imagists and, to some extent, Kliuev – all of them were impossible without the Revolution, either as a group or separately. ... They are not the artists of the proletarian Revolution, but her artist "fellow-travellers", in the sense in which this word was used by the old Socialists... As regards a "fellow-traveller", the question always comes up – How far will he go? This question cannot be answered in advance, not even approximately. The solution of it depends, not so much on the personal qualities of this or that "fellow-traveller", but mainly on the objective trend of things during the coming decade.Victor Suvorov in his "Soviet military intelligence" (1984) referred to a less respectable term "shit-eaters" (Russian: говноед) used by the GRU handlers when talking about the category of agents of influence who were conscious sympathisers of the Soviet movement:

Nazi Germany
In the aftermath of the Second World War, the Russian term poputchik (fellow traveller) was translated to the German as Mitläufer, to identify a person who, although not formally charged with participation in war crimes, was sufficiently involved with the Nazi régime to the extent that the Allied authorities responsible for the denazification of Germany could not legally exonerate them from association with the war crimes of the Wehrmacht.

Greece
For the term fellow traveller, the reactionary Régime of the Colonels (1967–74) used the Greek word Synodiporia ("The ones walking the street together") as an umbrella term that described domestic Greek Leftists and democratic opponents of the military dictatorship; likewise, the military government used term Diethnis ("international Synodiporia") to identify the foreign supporters of the domestic anti-fascist Greeks.

American usages

Pre-World War II U.S.
In the U.S., the European term fellow-traveller was adapted to describe persons politically sympathetic to, but  not members of, the Communist Party USA (CPUSA), who shared the political perspectives of Communism. In the 1920s and 1930s, the political, social, and economic problems in the U.S. and throughout the world, caused partly by the Great Depression, motivated idealistic young people, artists, and intellectuals to become sympathetic to the Communist cause, in hope they could overthrow capitalism. To that end, black Americans joined the CPUSA (1919) because some of their politically liberal stances (e.g. legal racial equality) corresponded to the political struggles of black people for civil rights and social justice, in the time when Jim Crow laws established and maintained racial segregation throughout the United States. Moreover, the American League for Peace and Democracy (ALPD) was the principal socio-political group who actively worked by anti-fascism rather than by pacifism; as such, the ALPD was the most important organization within the Popular Front, a pro-Soviet coalition of anti-fascist political organizations.

As in Europe, in the 1920s and 1930s, the intellectuals of the U.S. either sympathized with or joined the U.S. Communist Party, to oppose the economic excesses of capitalism and fascism, which they perceived as its political form. In 1936, the newspaper columnist Max Lerner included the term fellow traveler in the article "Mr. Roosevelt and His Fellow Travelers" (The Nation).  

In 1938, Joseph Brown Matthews Sr. featured the term in the title of his political biography Odyssey of a Fellow Traveler (1938); later, J. B. Matthews was the chief investigator for the anti-Communist activities of the House Un-American Activities Committee (HUAC). Robert E. Stripling also credited Matthews: "J.B. Matthews, a former Communist fellow traveler (and, incidentally, the originator of that apt tag)..."

Among the writers and intellectuals known as fellow travelers were Ernest Hemingway and Theodore Dreiser novelists whose works of fiction occasionally were critical of capitalism and its excesses, whilst John Dos Passos, a known left-winger, moved to the right-wing and became a staunch anti-Communist.

Likewise, the editor of The New Republic magazine, Malcolm Cowley had been a fellow traveler during the 1930s, but broke from the Communist Party, because of the ideological contradictions inherent to the Molotov–Ribbentrop Pact (Treaty of Non-aggression between Germany and the Union of Soviet Socialist Republics, 23 August 1939). The novelist and critic Waldo Frank was a fellow traveler during the mid-1930s, and was the chairman of the League of American Writers, in 1935, but was ousted as such, in 1937, when he called for an enquiry to the reasons for Joseph Stalin's purges (1936–38) of Russian society.

From 1934 to 1939, the historian Richard Hofstadter briefly was a member of the Young Communist League USA. Despite disillusionment because of the non-aggression pact between Nazi Germany and Communist Russia and the ideological rigidity of the Communist party-line, Hofstadter remained a fellow traveler until the 1940s. In Who Owns History?: Rethinking the Past in a Changing World (2003), Eric Foner said that Hofstatdter continued thinking of himself as a political radical, because his opposition to capitalism was the reason he had joined the CPUSA.

Moreover, in the elegiac article "The Revolt of the Intellectuals" (Time 6 Jan. 1941), the ex-Communist Whittaker Chambers satirically used the term fellow traveler:

Post-World War II U.S.
In the late 1930s, most fellow-travelers broke with the Communist party-line of Moscow when Stalin and Adolf Hitler signed the German–Soviet Non-aggression Pact (August 1939), which allowed the Occupation of Poland (1939–45) for partitioning between the U.S.S.R. and Nazi Germany. In the U.S., the American Communist Party abided Stalin's official party-line, and denounced the Allies, rather than the Germans, as war mongers. In June 1941, when the Nazis launched Operation Barbarossa, to annihilate the U.S.S.R., again, the American Communist Party abided Stalin's party-line, and became war hawks for American intervention to the European war in aid of Russia, and becoming an ally of the Soviet Union.

At War's end, the Russo–American Cold War emerged in the 1946–48 period, and American Communists found themselves at the political margins of U.S. society – such as being forced out of the leadership of trade unions; in turn, membership to the Communist Party of the U.S.A. declined. Yet, in 1948, American Communists did campaign for the presidential run of Henry A. Wallace, President Franklin D. Roosevelt's vice-president. In February 1956, to the 20th congress of the C.P.S.U., Nikita Khrushchev delivered the secret speech, On the Cult of Personality and Its Consequences, denouncing Stalinism and the cult of personality for Josef Stalin; those political revelations ended the ideological relationship between many fellow-travelers in the West and the Soviet version of Communism.

McCarthyism
In 1945, the anti-Communist congressional House Committee on Un-American Activities (HUAC) became a permanent committee of the U.S. Congress; and, in 1953, after Senator Joseph McCarthy became chairman of the Permanent Subcommittee on Investigations, they attempted to determine the extent of Soviet influence in the U.S. government, and in the social, cultural, and political institutions of American society.

That seven-year period (1950–56) of moral panic and political witch hunts was the McCarthy Era, characterized by right-wing political orthodoxy. Some targets of investigation were created by way of anonymous and unfounded accusations of treason and subversion, during which time the term fellow traveler was applied as a political pejorative against many American citizens who did not outright condemn Communism. Modern critics of HUAC claim that any citizen who did not fit or abide the HUAC's ideologically narrow definition of "American" was so labeled – which, they claimed, contradicted, flouted, and voided the political rights provided for every citizen in the U.S. Constitution.

In the course of his political career, the Republican Sen. McCarthy claimed at various times that there were many American citizens (secretly and publicly) sympathetic to Communism and the Soviet Union who worked in the State Department and in the U.S. Army, in positions of trust incompatible with such beliefs. In response to such ideological threats to the national security of the U.S., some American citizens with Communist pasts were suspected of being "un-American" and thus secretly and anonymously registered to a blacklist (particularly in the arts) by their peers, and so denied employment and the opportunity to earn a living, despite many such acknowledged ex-communists moving on from the fellow traveler stage of their political lives, such as the Hollywood blacklist.

Contemporary usages
The New Fontana Dictionary of Modern Thought (1999), defines the term fellow-traveller as a post-revolutionary political term derived from the Russian word poputchik, with which the Bolsheviks described political sympathizers who hesitated to publicly support the Bolshevik Party and Communism in Russia, after the Revolution of 1917.

The New Shorter Oxford English Dictionary (1993) defines the term fellow-traveller as "a non-Communist who sympathizes with the aims and general policies of the Communist Party"; and, by transference, as a "person who sympathizes with, but is not a member of another party or movement".

Safire's Political Dictionary (1978), defines the term fellow traveller as a man or a woman "who accepted most Communist doctrine, but was not a member of the Communist party"; and, in contemporary usage, defines the term fellow traveller as a person "who agrees with a philosophy or group, but does not publicly work for it."

See also
Fellow Travelers (miniseries)
Agent of influence
Fifth column
Anti-americanism
Capitalist roader
Fraternal party
Pinko
Tankie
Useful idiot
Mitläufer (fellow traveller of the Nazis)
Putinversteher

Footnotes

Further reading
 
 
 
 Rossinow, Doug. "'The Model of a Model Fellow Traveler': Harry F. Ward, the American League for Peace and Democracy, and the 'Russian Question' in American Politics, 1933–1956." Peace & Change (2004) 29#2 pp: 177-220. online
 

Political terminology
Communism